Ikhsan Leonardo Imanuel Rumbay (born 15 January 2000) is an Indonesian badminton player, who also plays for the PB Djarum club in national events. He also attended Special Sports School Ragunan.

Career 
Rumbay started his senior tournament at the 32nd Brazil International. He played from the qualification round and made it to quarter final where he lost to Jason Ho-shue 15–21 18–21. A week later, he played at the III Peru International Series where he became runner-up to Luis Ramón Garrido. In December 2017, he clinched the boys' singles title at the Junior National Championships in Pangkal Pinang, after beating Gatjra Piliang Fiqihilahi Cupu in straight games. Rumbay was part of the national junior team that won the bronze medals at the 2018 Asian Junior Championships in the team and singles event.

Rumbay  competed at the 2018 Summer Youth Olympics in Buenos Aires, Argentina representing his country, but lost to Lakshya Sen of India in the quarter final. He participated at the World Junior Championships in Markham, Canada, and helped the team win the bronze medal.

2023 
In January, Rumbay  competed at the home tournament, Indonesia Masters, but had to lose in the first qualifying round from Indian player B. Sai Praneeth.

Achievements

Asian Junior Championships 
Boys' singles

BWF International Challenge/Series (4 titles, 1 runner-up) 
Men's singles

 BWF International Challenge tournament
 BWF International Series tournament
 BWF Future Series tournament

BWF Junior International (3 titles, 2 runners-up)  
Boys' singles

  BWF Junior International Grand Prix tournament
  BWF Junior International Challenge tournament
  BWF Junior International Series tournament
  BWF Junior Future Series tournament

Performance timeline

National team 
 Junior level

 Senior level

Individual competitions 
 Junior level

 Senior level

References

External links 

 

2000 births
Living people
People from Tomohon
Sportspeople from North Sulawesi
Indonesian male badminton players
Badminton players at the 2018 Summer Youth Olympics
21st-century Indonesian people